The France national rugby league team first played in 1934 on a tour of England. They have taken part in all World Cups, twelve in total, with the first being held in 1954 in France. They have never won the title but have finished runners-up in both 1954 and 1968.

All-time results record

1930s

1940s

1950s

1960s

1970s

1980s

1990s

2000s

2010s

2020s

Other Matches 

 17 March 1934 English League 32–16 France, Wilderspool Stadium, Warrington 11,100.  This game against an English representative side was the French team's first competitive match.
  6 May 1935 English League 25–18 France, Headingley Rugby Stadium, Leeds 15,000
 26 April 1936 France 8–5 Dominions Xlll, Stade Buffalo, Paris
 21 March 1937 France 3–6 Dominions Xlll, Stade Municipal, Toulouse 16,000
 1 November 1937 France 0–15 British Empire, Stade Buffalo, Paris 20,000
 26 May 1949 France 23–10 British Empire, Stade Chaban–Delmas, Bordeaux
  3 January 1954 France 19–15 Combined Nations, Stade de Gerland, Lyons
 10 August 1955 New Zealand Maoris 28–20 France,
 21 October 1956 France 17–18 English League, Stade Velodrome, Marseilles 20,000
 16 April 1958 English League 19–8 France, Headingley Rugby Stadium, Leeds 13,993
 22 November 1958 English League 8–26 France, Knowsley Road, St Helens 16,000
 3 August 1960 New Zealand Maoris 12–23 France,  5,044
25 October 2019 Junior Kangaroos 62–4 France, WIN Stadium, Wollongong
30 October 2019 Western Rams 20–22 France, Jock Colley Fields, Parkes 3,713

See also

Rugby league in France
France national rugby league team
France women's national rugby league team

References

External links 

 international results website
France – Results at rugbyleagueproject

France national rugby league team
Rugby league in France
Rugby league-related lists